The South Deccan Plateau dry deciduous forests is a tropical dry forest ecoregion in southern India. The ecoregion lies in the southernmost portion of the Deccan Plateau, and includes the southernmost portion of the Eastern Ghats.

The ecoregion lies in the rain shadow of the Western Ghats, and receives most of its rainfall with the June–September southwest monsoon. It is characterized by tall trees that drop their leaves during the dry winter and spring months. Much of the forest has been degraded through over-use, and thorn forests and shrub thickets are common. To the north and east, the dry deciduous forests transition to the drier Deccan thorn scrub forests.

Flora
Trees are draped in lianas in denser, mature forests. The vegetation is characterized by  Albizia amara, Anogeissus latifolia, Boswellia serrata, Cassia fistula, Chloroxylon swietenia, Dalbergia latifolia, Diospyros montana, Hardwickia binata, Pterocarpus marsupium, Senegalia catechu, Shorea talura, Sterospermum personatum, Terminalia bellirica, Terminalia paniculata, and Terminalia elliptica. Sal found here is used for railway sleepers and house construction while teak, a durable timber, is used for ship building and furniture. Sandalwood (Santalum album) is used for perfume and semal for toys.

Fauna
The ecoregion is home to 75 mammal species. Threatened species include the Indian elephant (Elephas maximus), wild dog (Cuon alpinus), sloth bear (Melursus ursinus), chousingha (Tetracerus quadricornis), gaur (Bos gaurus), and grizzled giant squirrel (Ratufa macruora). Salim Ali's fruit bat (Latidens salimalii) is critically endangered, and is near-endemic. 260 species of birds live in the eco-region, and two, the rufous babbler (Turdoides subrufus) and yellow-throated bulbul (Pycnonotus xantholaemus) are near-extinct. The threatened great Indian bustard (Ardeotis nigriceps) and lesser florican (Eupodotis indica'') inhabit the eco-region.

Protected areas

 Bannerghatta National Park, Karnataka 
 Biligiriranga Swamy Temple Wildlife Sanctuary, Karnataka 
 Cauvery Wildlife Sanctuary, Karnataka 
 Melkote Temple Wildlife Sanctuary, Karnataka 
 Ranganthittu Bird Sanctuary, Karnataka 
 Sathyamangalam Wildlife Sanctuary, Tamil Nadu 
 Vedanthangal Bird Sanctuary, Tamil Nadu 
Cauvery North Wildlife Sanctuary, Tamil Nadu

See also
Bayalu Seeme
List of ecoregions in India

References

 
Ecoregions of India
Indomalayan ecoregions
Tropical and subtropical dry broadleaf forests